is a village located in Nagano Prefecture, Japan. , the village had an estimated population of 2,738 in 1130 households, and a population density of 80 persons per km².

Geography
Omi is located in the centre of Nagano Prefecture. The Kitayama Dam and the Hijiri Highlands are located in the village.

Surrounding municipalities
Nagano Prefecture
 Nagano
 Chikuma
 Ikusaka
 Chikuhoku

Climate
The village has a climate characterized by characterized by hot and humid summers, and cold winters (Köppen climate classification Cfa).  The average annual temperature in Omi is 10.3 °C. The average annual rainfall is 1159 mm with September as the wettest month. The temperatures are highest on average in August, at around 23.7 °C, and lowest in January, at around -2.3 °C.

Demographics
Per Japanese census data, the population of Omi has been declining over the past 70 years.

History
The area of present-day Ikusaka was part of ancient Shinano Province and the name of "Omi" appears in the Kamakura period Azuma kagami. The area was part of the holdings of Matsumoto Domain during the Edo period. The village of Ikusaka was established on April 1, 1889 by the establishment of the modern municipalities system. An attempt to merge with neighboring Chikuhoku was rejected by voters in 2004.

Economy
The economy of the village is based on agriculture.

Education
Omi has one public elementary school and one public middle school shared with the neighboring village of Chikuhoku. The village does not have a high school.

Transportation

Railway
 East Japan Railway Company - Shinonoi Line

Highway

 Nagano Expressway

Local attractions
Hijiri Museum

References

External links

Official Website 

 
Villages in Nagano Prefecture